Scopula castissima is a moth of the family Geometridae. It was described by Warren in 1897. It is endemic to Australia.

References

Moths described in 1897
castissima
Endemic fauna of Australia
Moths of Australia
Taxa named by William Warren (entomologist)